"Rockin' Soul" is a song by American trio the Hues Corporation, written by Wally Holmes. The song is the title track of the band's 1974 second album Rockin' Soul. 

The song was a top 20 hit in the U.S., reaching No. 18 on the Billboard Hot 100, their third of five charting singles. "Rockin' Soul" was also a top 40 hit in Canada and the UK.

Chart history

Weekly charts

Year-end charts

References

External links
 Lyrics of this song
 

1974 songs
1974 singles
Hues Corporation songs
RCA Records singles
Disco songs